Carl Schøyen (6 July 1877 – 5 March 1951) was a Norwegian poet and non-fiction writer. He was born in Kristiansand, and his family later moved to Kristiania. A summer with his uncle at Skomvær Lighthouse at Røst was influential for his later literary career. He made his literary debut in 1895 with the poetry collection Melodier. Among his other books are Tre stammers møte from 1918, and I Sameland from 1924. He argued for the preservation of nature, including protection of the common eider and eagles, and of the forests of Pasvikdalen. He was decorated Knight, First Class of the Order of St. Olav in 1948.

References

External links
 Melodier - poetry book written by Carl Schøyen at Norwegian National Library
 Tre stammers møte - book written by Carl Schøyen at Norwegian National Library
 Carl Schøyen's family tree at Geni.com

1877 births
1951 deaths
People from Kristiansand
19th-century Norwegian poets
Norwegian male poets
Norwegian non-fiction writers
Norwegian environmentalists
19th-century Norwegian male writers
Male non-fiction writers